Dan McIntyre is a jazz guitarist and composer from Chicago, Illinois.

McIntyre was born in Chicago's Northwest side. His early musical influences included guitarists Wes Montgomery, Herb Ellis, Joe Pass and Barney Kessell.

He has performed with Della Reese, Diahann Carroll and Vic Damone and toured North America and Europe with Frank Sinatra, Jr. in the 1970s and 1980s.

McIntyre has released a CD titled Hourglass on the Southport label.

References

American jazz guitarists
Smooth jazz guitarists
Year of birth missing (living people)
Living people
Guitarists from Chicago
American male guitarists
Jazz musicians from Illinois
American male jazz musicians
Date of birth missing (living people)